The following radio stations broadcast on FM frequency 105.9 MHz:

Argentina
 Activa in Córdoba
 Atlantic in Selva, Santiago del Estero
 Ibiza in Santa Fe
 LRS354 Cadena Regional in Alcorta, Santa Fe
 Parque Vida in Buenos Aires
 Radio María in Sarmiento, Chubut
 Santafesina in Villa Gobernador Gálvez, Santa Fe
 Zonica in Buenos Aires

Australia
 ABC Classic FM in Wagga Wagga, New South Wales
 ABC Classic FM in Melbourne, Victoria
 Radio National in Strahan, Tasmania
 Radio National in Mildura, Victoria
 2GZF in Orange, New South Wales

Canada (Channel 290)
 CBAF-FM-17 in St. John's, Newfoundland and Labrador
 CBKA-FM in La Ronge, Saskatchewan
 CBKW-FM in Pelican Narrows, Saskatchewan
 CFEP-FM in Eastern Passage, Nova Scotia
 CFMA-FM in Cache Creek, British Columbia
 CFMS-FM in Markham, Ontario
 CHPD-FM in Aylmer, Ontario
 CICX-FM in Orillia, Ontario
 CIFM-FM-5 in Barriere, British Columbia
 CIHO-FM-1 in La Malbaie, Quebec
 CITA-FM in Moncton, New Brunswick
 CJRY-FM in Edmonton, Alberta
 VF2379 in Missinipe, Saskatchewan
 VF2470 in New Hazelton, British Columbia
 VF2477 in Trois-Rivieres, Quebec
 VF2501 in Regina, Saskatchewan
 VF2505 in Fort St. James, British Columbia
 VF2540 in Castlegar, British Columbia

China 
 CNR Business Radio in Changsha and Hengyang

Indonesia
 Ardan FM in Bandung

Malaysia
 Lite in Kuala Terengganu, Terengganu
 TraXX FM in Sik, Kedah

Mexico
XHBX-FM in Sabinas, Coahuila
XHCOM-FM in Santa Isabel Cholula, Puebla
XHCOV-FM in Poza Rica, Veracruz
XHCUN-FM in Cancún, Quintana Roo
XHFCY-FM in Kanasin (Mérida), Yucatán
XHGAI-FM in Puerto Vallarta, Jalisco
 XHGU-FM in Ciudad Juárez, Chihuahua
XHHER-FM in Hermosillo, Sonora
XHLE-FM in Medellín, Veracruz
XHLM-FM in Tuxtla Gutiérrez, Chiapas
XHMIG-FM in San Miguel de Allende, Guanajuato
XHNA-FM in Matamoros, Tamaulipas
XHNES-FM in Nogales, Sonora
XHPES-FM in Puerto Escondido, Oaxaca
XHQJ-FM in Guadalajara, Jalisco
XHQN-FM in Torreón, Coahuila
XHSCAM-FM in Ziracuaretiro, Michoacán
XHSCJZ-FM in Metztitlán, Hidalgo
XHSU-FM in Mexicali, Baja California

Philippines
 DWLA in Metro Manila
 DYBT in Cebu City
 DXMX in Davao City
 DZCA-FM in Legazpi City
 DYWT in Iloilo City
 DXWW-FM in Zamboanga City

United Kingdom
 Academy FM (Folkestone) in Folkestone, Kent
Greatest Hits Radio Liverpool in Liverpool, Merseyside
Sunshine Radio in Ludlow, Shropshire

United States (Channel 290)
 KAAQ in Alliance, Nebraska
 KAHL-FM in Hondo, Texas
 KALC in Denver, Colorado
 KBZE in Berwick, Louisiana
 KCCQ-LP in Crescent City, California
 KCIX in Garden City, Idaho
 KCNL in Quartzsite, Arizona
 KCZN-LP in McAllen, Texas
 KDFJ-LP in Fairbanks, Alaska
 KDKQ-LP in Derby, Kansas
 KEME-LP in Boulder, Montana
 KFBW in Vancouver, Washington
 KFMK in Round Rock, Texas
 KFXZ-FM in Opelousas, Louisiana
 KGBX-FM in Nixa, Missouri
 KHOT-FM in Paradise Valley, Arizona
 KIBQ in Austwell, Texas
 KICP in Patterson, Iowa
 KIRC in Seminole, Oklahoma
 KKBO in Flasher, North Dakota
 KKCD in Omaha, Nebraska
 KKSW in Lawrence, Kansas
 KKWS in Wadena, Minnesota
 KLAZ in Hot Springs, Arkansas
 KLJN in Coos Bay, Oregon
 KMIT (FM) in Mitchell, South Dakota
 KMJ-FM in Fresno, California
 KNRS-FM in Centerville, Utah
 KOLH-LP in Hermiston, Oregon
 KORC-LP in Corvallis, Oregon
 KPOI-FM in Honolulu, Hawaii
 KPWR in Los Angeles, California
 KQIK-FM in Haileyville, Oklahoma
 KQKY in Kearney, Nebraska
 KQPM in Ukiah, California
 KQTZ in Hobart, Oklahoma
 KRAZ in Santa Ynez, California
 KRJT in Elgin, Oregon
 KROZ-LP in Hobbs, New Mexico
 KRRW in Winthrop, Minnesota
 KRYC-LP in Yuba City, California
 KRZQ in Amargosa Valley, Nevada
 KRZY-FM in Santa Fe, New Mexico
 KSEL-FM in Portales, New Mexico
 KSSA in Ingalls, Kansas
 KTLB in Twin Lakes, Iowa
 KUKA (FM) in Driscoll, Texas
 KULH in Wheeling, Missouri
 KUZN in Centerville, Texas
 KWLG-LP in Montana City, Montana
 KWMY in Joliet, Montana
 KWNG in Red Wing, Minnesota
 KXQT in Stanton, Texas
 KYJK in Missoula, Montana
 KZZK in New London, Missouri
 WAYK in Valley Station, Kentucky
 WBCI in Bath, Maine
 WBGG-FM in Fort Lauderdale, Florida
 WBOF-LP in Fort Pierce, Florida
 WBZR-FM in Atmore, Alabama
 WCBV-LP in Lima, Ohio
 WCFS-FM in Elmwood Park, Illinois
 WCFS-LP in Du Quoin, Illinois
 WCGS in Little Valley, New York
 WCSQ-LP in Cobleskill, New York
 WDMK in Detroit, Michigan
 WEGZ in Washburn, Wisconsin
 WEZV in North Myrtle Beach, South Carolina
 WFAL in Milner, Georgia
 WGKC in Mahomet, Illinois
 WGKX in Memphis, Tennessee
 WHCN in Hartford, Connecticut
 WILN in Panama City, Florida
 WJOT-FM in Wabash, Indiana
 WJZR in Rochester, New York
 WKHQ-FM in Charlevoix, Michigan
 WKLS in Southside, Alabama
 WKLZ in Syracuse, New York
 WKPO in Soldiers Grove, Wisconsin
 WLDC-LP in Goshen, Indiana
 WLNI in Lynchburg, Virginia
 WMAL-FM in Woodbridge, Virginia
 WMEX-LP in Rochester, New Hampshire
 WMMC in Marshall, Illinois
 WNJK in Burgin, Kentucky
 WNKN in Middletown, Ohio
 WNRQ in Nashville, Tennessee
 WOCL in DeLand, Florida
 WOKZ (FM) in Fairfield, Illinois
 WOMM-LP in Burlington, Vermont
 WPFS-LP in Monmouth, Illinois
 WPYR-LP in Baton Rouge, Louisiana
 WPZX in Pocono Pines, Pennsylvania
 WQCK in Philipsburg, Pennsylvania
 WQXR-FM in Newark, New Jersey
 WRHB-LP in Mifflinville, Pennsylvania
 WRKS in Pickens, Mississippi
 WRTR in Brookwood, Alabama
 WSNP-LP in Stevens Point, Wisconsin
 WTMT in Weaverville, North Carolina
 WTNJ in Mount Hope, West Virginia
 WTZB in Englewood, Florida
 WURE-LP in Troy, North Carolina
 WVAO-LP in Athol, Massachusetts
 WVGA (FM) in Lakeland, Georgia
 WWHG in Evansville, Wisconsin
 WWJM in New Lexington, Ohio
 WXDE in Lewes, Delaware
 WXDX-FM in Pittsburgh, Pennsylvania
 WXHQ-LP in Newport, Rhode Island
 WXLE in Indian Lake, New York
 WXMK in Dock Junction, Georgia
 WXYK in Pascagoula, Mississippi
 WZED-LP in Newport, North Carolina

References

Lists of radio stations by frequency